Un'estate al mare is a 2008 film directed by Carlo Vanzina and Enrico Vanzina.

Plot
The film tells the story of a group of people during the summer: football fans, loving couples, single fathers, beautiful women and businessmen, emigrants who return to their country and great dramatic actors forced into comic situations etc.

References

External links
 

Italian drama films
Films directed by Carlo Vanzina
Films set in Rome
Films set in Sardinia
2000s Italian films